Mohamed Amine Touati (born 9 September 1998) is a Tunisian athlete specialising in the 400 metres hurdles. He won a bronze medal at the 2019 African Games. He competed at the 2020 Summer Olympics.

His personal best in the event is 49.14 seconds set in Doha in 2019.

International competitions

References

1998 births
Living people
Tunisian male hurdlers
World Athletics Championships athletes for Tunisia
Athletes (track and field) at the 2019 African Games
African Games medalists in athletics (track and field)
African Games bronze medalists for Tunisia
Place of birth missing (living people)
Athletes (track and field) at the 2020 Summer Olympics
Olympic athletes of Tunisia
Athletes (track and field) at the 2022 Mediterranean Games
Mediterranean Games competitors for Tunisia
21st-century Tunisian people